The buff-breasted babbler (Pellorneum tickelli) is a species of bird in the family Pellorneidae. It is found in Bangladesh, Cambodia, China, India, Laos, Malaysia, Myanmar, Thailand, and Vietnam. Its natural habitats are subtropical or tropical moist lowland forest and subtropical or tropical moist montane forest.

References

External links

 
 
 
 
 

buff-breasted babbler
Birds of Southeast Asia
Birds of Northeast India
Birds of Yunnan
buff-breasted babbler
buff-breasted babbler
Taxonomy articles created by Polbot
Taxobox binomials not recognized by IUCN